Jay Laga'aia (born 10 September 1963) is a New Zealand-Australian actor and singer. He is known internationally for his role as Captain Typho in the films Star Wars: Episode II – Attack of the Clones and Star Wars: Episode III – Revenge of the Sith.

Laga'aia is noted for his television roles, including Senior Constable Tommy Tavita in the Australian police drama Water Rats, lawyer David Silesi in the New Zealand legal drama Street Legal and Elijah Johnson in the long running Australian soap opera Home and Away.

He currently appears in an Australian Children's TV Series called Jay's Jungle, which has been broadcast since 2015. He is a regular feature on Australian kids program Play School.

Career
Laga'aia debuted as a musician in 1982 as a member of the Consorts, who released the Dalvanius Prime-produced single "Maoris on 45", which was one of the top selling singles in New Zealand in 1982.

Laga'aia is known for his part on Australian children's TV show Playschool, and also for his role as Captain Typho in the films Star Wars: Episode II – Attack of the Clones and Star Wars: Episode III – Revenge of the Sith. He played the recurring role of Draco in three episodes of the television series Xena: Warrior Princess.

Laga'aia was a regular in Australian television shows Water Rats, Play School, Surprise Surprise, and a contestant on Celebrity Big Brother in 2002 and had a guest role as Gabriel in McLeod's Daughters. He is also known for his stage productions such as The Lion King. Laga'aia played the role of Judas in a 1994 production of Jesus Christ Superstar in New Zealand.

On 9 October 2007, Laga'aia released a children's album, Come Dance and Sing. On 24 December 2008, Laga'aia performed on Carols by Candlelight. Laga'aia narrated each of the characters on the children's show Larry the Lawnmower, which ran for 2 seasons starting in 2008. In November 2009, it was confirmed that Laga'aia had joined the cast of Australian soap opera Home and Away, as Reverend Elijah Johnson, until his sacking in February 2012. Laga'aia released his second CD for children, I Can Play Anything, in August 2010.

In 2009 Laga'aia took on the role of Ambassador for the Touched by Olivia Foundation. In 2012 he was appointed as an Ambassador for kindergartens in Queensland.

In 2012 Laga'aia two albums, a Christmas album entitled Christmas at Jays Place and a nursery rhyme album called 10 in the Bed. He also provided the music for Scholastic's picture book 'Baby Elephant Walk'.

He returned to the stage to play the role of The Wonderful Wizard of Oz in the 2013-14 New Zealand and Australia national tour of the acclaimed Broadway musical, Wicked. In 2019, he was part of the Australian tour cast of Peter Pan Goes Wrong.

Personal life
Laga'aia was born and raised in Mangere, South Auckland, New Zealand, he is now a dual (New Zealand) and Australian citizen. He is of Samoan descent. He has six brothers and sisters and two half-brothers. One of his younger brothers, Frank Laga'aia, was a member of the ARIA award-winning band Ilanda.

Jay is also a member of the International Costuming group the 501st Legion as a member of the Terror Australis Garrison (Australia).

Since 1990, Laga'ia has been married to Sandra Jane Laga'aia, the head of maths at Sydney Secondary College Balmain Campus, whom he has eight children with.

Filmography

Film

Television

As himself

References

External links

Official website

1963 births
Australian male film actors
Australian people of Samoan descent
Australian male television actors
Living people
New Zealand male film actors
New Zealand people of Samoan descent
New Zealand male television actors
Naturalised citizens of Australia
New Zealand emigrants to Australia
Actors of Samoan descent
Australian children's television presenters
New Zealand children's television presenters
I'm a Celebrity...Get Me Out of Here! (Australian TV series) participants
People from Māngere